{{DISPLAYTITLE:C5H6O}}
The molecular formula C5H6O (molar mass: 82.10 g/mol, exact mass: 82.0419 u) may refer to:

 Cyclopentenone, or 2-cyclopentenone
 Methylfuran
 2-Methylfuran
 3-Methylfuran
 Pyran, or oxine